Surgeon Major Thomas Egerton Hale VC CB (24 September 1832 – 25 December 1909) was an English recipient of the Victoria Cross, the highest and most prestigious award for gallantry in the face of the enemy that can be awarded to British and Commonwealth forces.

Details
He was 22 years old, and an assistant surgeon in the 1st Battalion, 7th Regiment of Foot (later The Royal Fusiliers), British Army at Sebastopol in the Crimean War when the following deeds took place for which he was awarded the VC.

Further information
He later served in the Indian Mutiny and achieved the rank of surgeon major. His Victoria Cross is displayed at the Army Medical Services Museum in Mytchett, Surrey.

External links
Monuments to Courage (David Harvey, 1999)
The Register of the Victoria Cross (This England, 1997)
Location of grave and VC medal (Cheshire)
Obituary in the British Medical Journal

References

Crimean War recipients of the Victoria Cross
British recipients of the Victoria Cross
British Army personnel of the Crimean War
British military personnel of the Indian Rebellion of 1857
Royal Fusiliers officers
1832 births
1909 deaths
Burials in Cheshire
Military personnel from Cheshire
British Army regimental surgeons
People from Nantwich
Alumni of the University of St Andrews
Companions of the Order of the Bath
Fellows of the Royal Geographical Society
43rd Regiment of Foot officers
Fellows of the Royal Historical Society
88th Regiment of Foot (Connaught Rangers) officers
British Army recipients of the Victoria Cross
19th-century British Army personnel